Peace as a surname may refer to:

Charles Peace (1832–1879), English burglar and murderer
Chris Peace (American football) (born 1995), American football player
David Peace (born 1967), British author
Heather Peace (born 1975), English actress
Jeremy Peace (born 1956), English football club director
Joe Raymond Peace (born 1945), American football player and coach
Sir John Peace (born 1949), British businessman
Larry Peace (1917-2009), American football player
Florence Jane Short (aka Rachel Peace) (1881 – died after 1932), British feminist and suffragette
Robert Peace (1980–2011), the subject of The Short and Tragic Life of Robert Peace, a biography by Jeff Hobbs
Robin Peace, social scientist from New Zealand
Roger C. Peace (1899–1968), American politician from South Carolina; U. S. senator 1941
Stephen Peace (born 1953), American politician from California; member of the State Assembly 1993–2002
Warren Peace (contemporary), English vocalist, composer, and dancer